The Winnipeg Fringe Theatre Festival is an alternative theatre festival held each year for twelve days in July in Winnipeg, Manitoba, Canada.

History

Founded in 1988 by the Manitoba Theatre Centre with Larry Desrochers as the first Executive Producer, the festival has three key principles: 1. Festival is non-juried; 2. Artists have freedom to present whatever they want on stage; and 3. 100% of the box office goes directly to the artists. (though artists must pay a flat fee to enter)

In its first year ticket sales were 14,000 across nine days of performances. That figure was 26,000 in 1989 - year two of the festival. It climbed to 44,709 in 1999 and was over 60,000 in 2001.

Chuck McEwen, former director of the Toronto Fringe Festival, is the current executive producer, and has been in charge since 2008. The festival's venues are centred in  Winnipeg's historic Exchange District with the Old Market Square serving as the outdoor stage location. But as the festival has grown there are venues outside that district but still close to Winnipeg's downtown.

The Winnipeg Fringe Festival is modelled on the Edmonton Fringe Festival and provides several venues for performing companies, but some companies arrange their own venues, which is more like what occurs at the  Edinburgh Fringe festival. Regardless, all venues have paid technicians and volunteer ticket sellers and ushers.

The performing companies at the festival are both local and from across Canada and around the world. For example, the 2005 festival featured performers from France, Australia, New Zealand, the UK, and South Africa as well as across Canada and the United States.

Paid attendance briefly set a record high for North America in 2009 with 81,565 tickets sold, surpassing the then previous record of 77,700 set at the 2006 Edmonton Fringe. However, the Edmonton Fringe festival currently holds the North American record for 2011 with 104,142 tickets sold.

The Royal Manitoba Theatre Centre cancelled the 2020 Winnipeg Fringe Festival as a safety precaution in light of the COVID-19 pandemic. The 2020 festival was scheduled to take place from July 15 to 26. RMTC considered rescheduling the event to late Summer or Fall but ultimately decided to cancel the physical event. Instead, the RMTC offered free online programming from July 14 to 17 beginning at 7PM nightly. The online festival featured local, national, and international programming including performances from Mike Delamont, Frances Koncan, the Coldhearts, Outside Joke, and Anjali Sandhu. Online festival programming was streamed on YouTube and Facebook.

Annual theme

The festival has a different theme each year. The theme in 2015 was "We're all <blank> here," where the blank was filled in variously. On the program, it was "mad," but on the website for Volunteers it was "friends." In 2014, "We like when you watch" was the theme. The Big Top was the theme in 2010, and other previous themes have been the F word, meaning "fringe," and James Bond.  In 2012 there was no theme, as that was the 25th anniversary edition of the festival.

Attendance and ticket revenue

Harry S. Rintoul Memorial Award

The Harry S. Rintoul Memorial Award was established by the Manitoba Association of Playwrights to recognize the best play written by a Manitoban and performed at the festival. The award was named in memory of Harry Rintoul, a noted playwright from Winnipeg who died in 2002.

List of laureates 
2002: Kevin Klassen, Aftertaste
2003: Joseph Aragon, The Unlikely Sainthood of Madeline McKay
2004: Daniel Thau-Eleff, Three Ring Circus: Israel, the Palestinians and My Jewish Identity
2005: Jason Neufeld, The Rise and Fall of Bloody Redemption
2006: Stefanie Wiens, Max and Mirabelle
2007: Ross McMillan, The Ingrates
2008: Daniel Thau-Eleff, Remember the Night
2009: Joseph Aragon, Bloodless: The Trial of Burke and Hare
2010: Muriel Hogue, Scar Tissue
2011: Jessy Ardern and Ariel Levine, Sigurd the Dragonslayer
2012: Scott Douglas, The Touring Test
2013: Jessy Ardern and Ariel Levine, The Hound of Ulster
2014: Bill Pats, Executing Justice
2015: Sydney Hayduk and Justin Otto, Manic Pixie Dream Girl
2016: Frances Koncan, 
2017: Wren Brian, Anomie
2018: Walk & Talk Theatre Company, The Ballad of Johnny Boy
2019: Connor Joseph, Cuinn Joseph, and Jacob Herd, The Cause
2022: Sarah Flynn, Whatever Happens After?

References

External links
 

Festivals in Winnipeg
Theatre festivals in Manitoba
Fringe festivals in Canada
1988 establishments in Manitoba
Festivals established in 1988
Annual events in Winnipeg